Ruth Whipple Crocker (born December 10, 1946) is an American writer and author of the memoir Those Who Remain: Remembrance and Reunion After War, which began as a Pushcart Prize-nominated essay in O-Dark-Thirty.

Biography

Crocker was born in 1946 in Mystic, Connecticut.  After attending Mitchell College in New London, Connecticut, she met and married West Point officer David R. Crocker, Jr. When her husband died during the Vietnam War, Crocker went back to school and received a B.S. from the University of Connecticut; an MA in education from Tufts University; and a PhD in nutrition and human development from the University of Connecticut. She received her MFA in creative writing from Bennington College in 2011. Her nonfiction essay "Sam's Way" in The Gettysburg Review was listed as a notable essay of 2012 in Best American Essays 2013.

Crocker is on the National Board of the Gold Star Wives of America. She resides in Mystic, Connecticut, and has one son, Noah Bean.

Bibliography

Books
Those Who Remain: Remembrance and Reunion After War (2014)
People of Yellowstone (2017)

Essays
"Reunion and Remembrance," T.A.P.S. Magazine (2013)
"What the Dog Understood," O-Dark-Thirty Magazine (2013)
"Sam’s Way," The Gettysburg Review (2012)
"Try to Remember," Bennington Review (2011)

References

External links 
Ruth Crocker was a guest alongside authors Lev Grossman and Brian Slattery on WNPR’s "Why We’ll Always Need New Books.”
Ruth Crocker’s event at the ongoing Dire Literary Series in Cambridge, MA
An interview with Ruth Crocker on WTNH-TV's "CT Style."

1946 births
Living people
American essayists
People from Mystic, Connecticut